The Diocese of Owensboro is a Latin Church ecclesiastical territory or diocese of the Catholic Church in Kentucky. , the diocese contained of 78 parishes and two Newman Centers in 32 counties of western Kentucky.

The current bishop, William Medley, was the pastor of Saint Bernadette Parish of the Archdiocese of Louisville prior to his consecration which took place February 10, 2010. The Diocese of Owensboro is a suffragan diocese in the ecclesiastical province of the metropolitan Archdiocese of Louisville.

History
Pope Pius XI erected the Diocese of Owensboro in territory taken from the Diocese of Louisville on 9 December 1937, simultaneously elevating the latter to a Metropolitan Archdiocese and designating the new diocese as one of its suffragans.  The original cathedral for the diocese was to be established in Henderson, Kentucky at Holy Name of Jesus Catholic Church, but was changed to the city of Owensboro. The diocese's cathedral is named after St. Stephen, the first Christian martyr.

Sexual abuse
In April 2019, the Diocese of Owensboro released a list of 15 priests who were accused of sexually abusing children while serving in the diocese. Two of these priests, Joseph J. Pilger and Louis Francis Piskula, were convicted, with Pilger receiving a five-year probation sentence in 1995 and Piskula receiving a five-year prison sentence in 2014. Piskula later died in prison in 2018. Two other credibly accused priests, Richard M. Powers and Joseph Robert "Bob" Willet, were forced to pay settlements in 1999. Pilger also was ordered to pay a $5.2M settlement to at least 27 accusers in 2003, the same year he was murdered.

In 2018, the diocese removed Gerald Baker from active ministry in the diocese after determining that sexual abuse accusations against him were credible. In March 2019, the diocese temporarily suspended Joseph Edward "Ed" Bradley after allegations of sexual abuse of a minor were made. In May 2019, the diocese recommended that Bradley be permanently removed from public service. As of October 2019, the Vatican has not ruled on the recommendation.

Bishops

Bishops of Owensboro
 Francis Ridgley Cotton (1937-1961) 
 Henry Joseph Soenneker (1961-1982)
 John Jeremiah McRaith (1982-2009)
 William Francis Medley (2009–present)

High schools and university
 Owensboro Catholic High School, Owensboro
 St. Mary High School, Paducah
 Trinity High School, Whitesville
 Brescia University, Owensboro

See also
 Catholic Church by country
 Catholic Church hierarchy
 List of the Catholic dioceses of the United States

References

External links 
Diocese of Owensboro Official Site

 
Christian organizations established in 1937
Catholic Church in Kentucky
Owensboro
Owensboro
Roman Catholic Ecclesiastical Province of Louisville
1937 establishments in Kentucky